Connor Galvin is an American football offensive tackle for the Baylor Bears.

Early life
Galvin grew up in Texas and attended Katy High School, where he helped them compile a football record of 12–1 as a senior. He was a four-star prospect according to ESPN, while being rated three stars by Rivals.com and 247Sports. He was rated the 18th-best offensive tackle according to ESPN and the 488th best player overall according to 247Sports.

College career
Galvin committed to Baylor University over scholarship offers from UCLA, Florida, TCU, and Colorado. As a freshman, he played in all thirteen games, starting six at left tackle. His first start came against West Virginia.

In his sophomore season, Galvin played in ten games, missing four due to injury, being a starter in nine. He started the first five games of the year before suffering an injury, coming back for their game against Oklahoma. He was a starter in the final four games of the year.

As a junior, Galvin was named Preseason All-Big 12 and started eight games at left tackle.

After his senior season, Galvin was named third-team All-American by Associated Press and was named the Big 12 Offensive Lineman of the Year.

Rather than declare for the NFL Draft, Galvin announced that he would return to the team in 2022 as a fifth-year player.

References

Year of birth missing (living people)
Living people
American football offensive tackles
Baylor Bears football players
Players of American football from Texas